Cody Jorden Riley (born December 12, 1997) is an American professional basketball player for KK Rogaška of the Premier A Slovenian Basketball League. He played college basketball for the UCLA Bruins.

High school career
Riley attended Sierra Canyon School in Chatsworth, California. He averaged 14.5 points and 7.7 rebounds per game as a freshman for a team that finished 29–4. Riley was named MaxPreps Freshman of the Year. As a sophomore, he averaged 15.6 points and 9.4 rebounds per game and led the team to a 26–4 record and the California Division V title. Riley was named a sophomore All-American by MaxPreps. He averaged 12.5 points and 7.9 rebounds per game for the Trailblazers as a junior, leading the team to the CIF Southern Section Open Division final before losing to state champion Chino Hills High School. Riley earned First Team All-Area honors from the Los Angeles Daily News and Third Team All-State according to Cal-Hi Sports. In the summer of 2016, he averaged 13.7 points and 7.3 rebounds per game in the Nike Elite Youth Basketball League, playing alongside Marvin Bagley III.

As a senior at Sierra Canyon, Riley averaged 16.3 points and 8.3 rebounds per game. He was the No. 45 overall recruit in his class according to ESPN and a four-star prospect. In October 2016, Riley committed to playing college basketball for UCLA over offers from Kansas, USC, UConn and Oklahoma.

College career
Prior to the start of his freshman season, Riley was one of three UCLA players (along with Jalen Hill and LiAngelo Ball) who were arrested in China for allegedly shoplifting before their game against Georgia Tech. The arrested players were confined to their hotel for several days until the charges were dropped and the players were allowed to leave the country. Riley and the other two players were suspended indefinitely from the team after their return to campus, and on December 22, 2017, UCLA announced that Riley and Hill would remain suspended for the entire season, but were allowed to join practices and team activities on December 26. Riley declared for the 2018 NBA draft, but opted to withdraw and continue his college career at UCLA.

Riley averaged 5.5 points, 4.1 rebounds and 0.4 blocks per game as a redshirt freshman. As a sophomore, he averaged 8.8 points and 4.5 rebounds per game. On January 8, 2021, Riley scored a career-high 22 points to go with 13 rebounds in a 81–75 overtime win against Arizona State. He averaged 10 points and 5.4 rebounds per game as a junior, shooting 53.8% from the field and helping the Bruins reach the Final Four. Following the season, Riley declared for the 2021 NBA draft, but ultimately returned to UCLA. In the 2021–22 season opener against Cal State Bakersfield, he sustained a left medial collateral ligament sprain after a collison in the first half. He was sidelined for almost two months before returning in January 2022. In his second game back, he had a career-high four steals in a win over California. He decided not to return for a sixth season, forgoing his remaining season of eligibility.

Professional career
After going undrafted in the 2022 NBA draft, Riley signed with KK Rogaška of the Premier A Slovenian Basketball League.

Career statistics

College

|-
| style="text-align:left;"| 2017–18
| style="text-align:left;"| UCLA
| style="text-align:center;" colspan="11" style="text-align: center;" |  Redshirt
|-
| style="text-align:left;"| 2018–19
| style="text-align:left;"| UCLA
| 30 || 8 || 17.5 || .474 || .300 || .523 || 4.1 || .7 || .3 || .4 || 5.5
|-
| style="text-align:left;"| 2019–20
| style="text-align:left;"| UCLA
| 31 || 17 || 20.4 || .518 || .000 || .548 || 4.5 || .8 || .4 || .5 || 8.8
|-
| style="text-align:left;"| 2020–21
| style="text-align:left;"| UCLA
| 31 || 31 || 23.3 || .538 || .000 || .663 || 5.4 || 1.3 || .4 || .7 || 10.0
|-
| style="text-align:left;"| 2021–22
| style="text-align:left;"| UCLA
| 26 || 20 || 21.6 || .464 || .500 || .672 || 3.9 || 1.0 || .7 || .4 || 7.3
|- class="sortbottom"
| style="text-align:center;" colspan="2"| Career
| 118 || 76 || 20.7 || .505 || .286 || .606 || 4.5 || .9 || .4 || .5 || 7.9

References

External links
UCLA Bruins bio

1997 births
Living people
American men's basketball players
Basketball players from Los Angeles
People from Chatsworth, Los Angeles
Power forwards (basketball)
Sierra Canyon School alumni
UCLA Bruins men's basketball players